Borislav Terzić (born 1 November 1991) is a Bosnian professional footballer who plays as a right-back for Serbian side Trayal Kruševac.

Club career
Terzić started his career at FK Lokomotiva Beograd, then he played for FK BASK and FK Zemun. He moved to FK Donji Srem, and made his debut in the highest rank of the Serbian football league, the Serbian SuperLiga. Also, he had two appearances for FC Zestafoni in Georgian Premier League. In a winter break of the 2013–14 season, he signed with FK Sloboda Užice.

In January 2018, Terzić signed with FK Sloboda Tuzla. After Sloboda, he also played with Zemun once again, before coming back to Bosnia and singing with FK Tuzla City on 8 June 2019. Terzić made his official debut for Tuzla City on 20 July 2019, in a 1–5 away league win against FK Zvijezda 09. On 27 November 2019, Terzić and Tuzla City terminated his contract on mutual agreement.

References

External links
 Borislav Terzić at worldfootball.net
 Borislav Terzić Stats at utakmica.rs

1991 births
Living people
People from Vlasenica
Serbs of Bosnia and Herzegovina
Association football fullbacks
Bosnia and Herzegovina footballers
FK BASK players
FK Zemun players
FK Donji Srem players
FC Zestafoni players
FK Sloboda Užice players
FK Radnički 1923 players
FK Voždovac players
FK Javor Ivanjica players
FK Sloboda Tuzla players
FK Tuzla City players
FK Zvijezda 09 players
FK Trayal Kruševac players
Serbian SuperLiga players
Erovnuli Liga players
Premier League of Bosnia and Herzegovina players
Serbian First League players
Bosnia and Herzegovina expatriate footballers
Expatriate footballers in Serbia
Bosnia and Herzegovina expatriate sportspeople in Serbia
Expatriate footballers in Georgia (country)
Bosnia and Herzegovina expatriate sportspeople in Georgia (country)